Roberto Orlando (born 5 August 1995) is an Italian javelin thrower.

Career
His personal best is of 80.35 m set in Rovereto on 26 June 2021. He finished 4th at the 2021 European Athletics Team Championships in Chorzów, and won with his new personal best at the 2021 Italian Championships in Rovereto.

Achievements

National titles
Orlando won two national championships at individual senior level.

Italian Athletics Championships
Javelin throw: 2021
Italian Winter Throwing Championships
Javelin throw: 2021

See also
 Italian all-time lists – Javelin throw

References

External links
 
 Roberto Orlando vuole Tokio 2021  

1995 births
Living people
Italian male javelin throwers
Italian Athletics Championships winners